Herdecovirus is a subgenus of viruses in the genus Deltacoronavirus, consisting of a single species, Night heron coronavirus HKU19.

References

Virus subgenera
Deltacoronaviruses